Yā Sīn (also Yaseen; , ; the letters 'Yāʼ' and 'Sīn') is the 36th chapter of the Quran (sūrah). It has 83 verses (āyāt). It is regarded an earlier "Meccan surah". Some scholars maintain that verse 12 is from the Medinan period. While the surah begins in Juz' 22, most of it is in Juz' 23.

The surah begins with the eponymous (muqatta'at) Arabic letters:  (yā sīn). The meaning of the letters Ya Sin, while being primarily unknown, is debated amongst Muslim religious academics. One of the interpretations is "O human being!" referring to Muhammad since the verses that follow are translated as "By the Qur´an, full of Wisdom, Thou art indeed one of the messengers". Tafsir al-Jalalayn, a Sunni beginners exegesis (tafsir), concludes, "God knows best what He means by these [letters]."

The surah focuses on establishing the Qur'an as a divine source, and it warns of the fate of those who mock God's revelations and are stubborn. The surah tells of the punishments that plagued past generations of nonbelievers as a warning to present and future generations. Additionally, the surah reiterates God's sovereignty as exemplified by His creations through signs from nature.

The surah ends with arguments in favor of the existence of Resurrection and God's sovereign power.

Summary
1 Ya Sin
2 By the Qur´an, full of Wisdom,-
3 Thou art indeed one of the messengers,.
4-5 The Quran given to warn the Makkans
6-9 The greater part of the people of Makkah reprobate
10 Muhammad's preaching only profitable to secret believers
11 The dead shall be raised; all their deeds are registered
12-13 Two apostles of Jesus sent to Antioch
14-17 They are rejected as impostors and threatened with stoning
18 The apostles warn the people of Antioch of impending divine judgments
19-26 A certain believer is put to death by the infidels
27-28 The persecutors are suddenly destroyed
29 Men generally reject God's messengers
30 The lessons of the past are forgotten
31-33 The doctrine of the resurrection asserted and illustrated
34-44 God's power and goodness manifested by his works
45-46 Unbelievers unmoved by either fear or the signs of the Quran
47-48 They scoff at almsgiving and the resurrection
49-53 The resurrection trumpet and the judgment-day shall surprise the unbelievers
54 God's judgment shall be according to works
55-65 The rewards of the righteous and the punishment of the wicked
66-68 God deals with the wicked as he pleaseth
69-70 Muhammad not a poet; the Quran is the word of God
71-73 God manifest in his works of benevolence
74-75 Idolaters will find their trust in idols vain
76 The Prophet not to grieve at the hard speeches of the idolaters; God knoweth all
77-81 The Creator of all things able to raise the dead to life
82 God says Be, and it is
83  Praise be to the Sovereign Creator and raiser of the dead

Heart of the Quran 

It has been proposed that yā sīn is the "heart of the Quran". The meaning of “the heart” has been the basis of much scholarly discussion. The eloquence of this surah is traditionally regarded as representative of the miraculous nature of the Qur'an. It presents the essential themes of the Qur'an, such as the sovereignty of God, the unlimited power of God as exemplified by His creations, Paradise, the ultimate punishment of nonbelievers, resurrection, the struggle of believers against polytheists and nonbelievers, and the reassurance that the believers are on the right path, among others. Yā Sīn presents the message of the Qur'an in an efficient and powerful manner, with its quick and rhythmic verses. This surah asserts that Muhammad was not a poet, rather he was the greatest and the Last Messenger of Allah (the "Seal of the Prophets").

Virtues 
It is recorded in Sunan al-Darimi that Muhammad said that "If anyone recites Yaseen at the beginning of the day, their needs for that day will be fulfilled.” In another narration, this Sūrah has been described as the key to all good in this life and in the hereafter and a safety from all evil in this life and in the hereafter. Needs are fulfilled if asked after the recitation of this Sūrah and the reward for its recitation is also compared to performing twenty hajj pilgrimages. Many scholars say that many virtues of Surah Yasin come from inauthentic Hadiths. Muhammad Ali Mirza says that there is one authentic Hadith regarding Surah Yasin. It is that Ibn Abbas, a Sahabi of Prophet Muhammad SAW, said that: Whoever recites Surah Yasin in the morning, the tasks he performs till night will become easy for him, or if someone recites it in the night, the tasks he performs during that night will become easy for him.

Sections and themes 

There are three main themes of yā sīn: the oneness of God (tawhid); Risala, that Muhammad is a messenger sent by God to guide His creations through divine revelation; and the reality of Akhirah, the Last Judgment. 36:70 “This is a revelation, an illuminating Qur’an to warn anyone who is truly alive, so that God’s verdict may be passed against the disbelievers.”  The surah repeatedly warns of the consequences of not believing in the legitimacy or the revelation of Muhammad, and encourages believers to remain steadfast and resist the mockery, oppression, and ridicule they receive from polytheists and nonbelievers. The arguments arise in three forms: a historical parable, a reflection on the order in the universe, and lastly a discussion of resurrection and human accountability.

The chapter begins with an affirmation of the legitimacy of Muhammad. For example, verses 2–6, "By the wise Qur'an, you [Muhammad] are truly one of the messengers sent of a straight path, with a revelation from the Almighty, the Lord of Mercy, to warn a people whose forefathers were not warned, and so they are unaware." The first passage, verses 1–12, focuses primarily with promoting the Qur'an as guidance and establishing that it is God's sovereign choice who will believe and who will not. It is stated that regardless of a warning, the nonbelievers cannot be swayed to believe. 36:10 "It is all the same to them whether you warn them or not: they will not believe."

Surah Yāʾ-Sīn then proceeds to tell the tale of the messengers that were sent to warn nonbelievers, but who were rejected. Although the messengers proclaimed to be legitimate, they were accused of being ordinary men by the nonbelievers. 36:15-17 "They said, 'Truly, we are messengers to you,' but they answered, 'You are only men like ourselves. The Lord of Mercy has sent nothing; you are just lying." However, a man from amongst these people beseeched them to believe in the messengers.  Upon his death, the man entered Paradise, and lamented the fate of the nonbelievers. 36:26 "He was told, 'Enter the Garden,' so he said, 'If only my people knew how my Lord has forgiven me and set me among the highly honored." This surah is meant to warn the nonbelievers of the consequences of their denial. Verse 36:30 goes on to state: "Alas for human beings! Whenever a messenger comes to them they ridicule him." Ultimately, it is God's will who will be blind and who will see.

The following passage addresses the signs of God's supremacy over nature. This is presented by the sign of revived land, the sign of day and night, the sign of the arc and the flood, and the sign of the sudden blast that arrives on the day of judgement. 36:33-37 The sign of revived land follows: The disbelievers do not recognize God's power in the natural world, although He is the one Creator.

The surah further addresses what will happen to those who reject the right path presented by Muhammad and refuse to believe in God. On the last day, the day of reckoning, the nonbelievers will be held accountable for their actions and will be punished accordingly. God warned the nonbelievers of Satan, and yet Satan led them astray. 36:60-63 "Children of Adam, did I not command you not to serve Satan, for he was your sworn enemy, but to serve Me? This is the straight path. He has led great numbers of you astray. Did you not use your reason? So this is the fire that you were warned against." Although God warned them against following Satan, the nonbelievers were deaf, and so now they will suffer the consequences of their ill judgements. 36:63 "So this is the Fire that you were warned against. Enter it today, because you went on ignoring [my commands]."

The surah proceeds to address the clear nature of the revelation and assure that Muhammad is a legitimate prophet. 36:69 states, "We have not taught the Prophet poetry, nor could he ever have been a poet." Yāʾ-Sīn concludes by reaffirming God's sovereignty and absolute power. 36:82-83 "When He wills something to be, His way is to say, 'Be'—and it is! So glory be to Him in whose Hand lies control over all things. It is to Him that you will all be brought back."
 It is to God, the one Creator who holds everything in His hands, that everything returns. The closing passage is absolute and powerful and carries an essential message of the Qur'an.

References

External links
Q36:20, 50+ translations, islamawakened.com
Quran 36 Clear Quran translation

Yasin, - "Okemuslim Okezone". Okezone.com. 
,  Scholars about Virtues of Surah Yasin zikrejameel.com

Ya Sin